Dendrobium jonesii, commonly known as the oak orchid is a species of epiphytic or lithophytic orchid endemic to far north Queensland. It has spindle-shaped pseudobulbs, up to seven thin, dark green leaves and up to thirty five crowded, star-like, fragrant cream-coloured or white flowers with purple markings on the labellum.

Description
The side lobes are curved and the middle lobe is oblong with an orange ridge along its midline. Flowering occurs from July to November.

Taxonomy and naming
Dendrobium jonesii was first formally described in 1901 by Alfred Barton Rendle from a specimen collected by "Mr. Arthur Owen Jones, J.P.". The description was published in the Journal of Botany, British and Foreign and the specific epithet (jonesii) honours the collector of the type specimen. 

There are two varieties:
Dendrobium jonesii var. jonesii;
Dendrobium jonesii var. magnificum (Dockrill) Dockrill – the large oak orchid which has larger flowers and a later flowering period.

Distribution and habitat
The oak orchid grows in rainforest and in open forest where it often grows on she-oaks (Casuarina species) between the Iron Range National Park and Paluma. The variety magnificum grow at higher altitudes in the southern part of the species' range.

References

jonesii
Orchids of Queensland
Endemic orchids of Australia
Plants described in 1901